Valco Cincinnati Inc., (d.b.a Valco Melton) is an American multinational corporation that designs and manufactures dispensing machinery and quality assurance systems for the inspection and fluid handling of adhesives, waxes, sealants, and industrial coatings to the packaging paper and paperboard converting, and nonwoven industries. The company is headquartered in Cincinnati, Ohio, with research and manufacturing facilities throughout North America and Europe, as well as direct offices and distributorships in over 76 countries.

Business profile
Established in 1952 and renamed in 2008, Valco Melton is a leading supplier of fluid dispensing systems, and compatible spare parts for industrial sealing applications, including boxes, cartons, packaging, coatings tissue, and textiles. Popular for producing standard adhesives found in packaging, Valco Melton's hot melt and glue systems are also used for applications like lotions, perfumes, and dispensers for lubricants and food products.

References 

Manufacturing companies established in 1952
Manufacturing companies based in Ohio
Companies based in Ohio
1952 establishments in Ohio